Frederick William Green (February 18, 1816 – June 18, 1879) was a lawyer, newspaperman, and a two-term U.S. Representative from Ohio from 1851 to 1855.

Early life and career 
Born in Fredericktown (now Frederick), Maryland, Green settled in Tiffin, Ohio, in 1833. He pursued an academic course and then studied law. He was admitted to the bar and commenced practice in Tiffin. He served as Auditor of Seneca County for six years.

Congress 
Green was elected as a Democrat to the Thirty-second and Thirty-third Congresses (March 4, 1851 – March 3, 1855). He was not a candidate for renomination. He subsequently moved to Cleveland, Ohio, and served as clerk of the United States District Court for the Northern District of Ohio from 1855 to 1866.

After Congress 
He was the editor of The Plain Dealer 1866–1874. Green was one of the Ohio commissioners to the Philadelphia Centennial Exposition in 1876. He served as a state oil inspector in 1878 and 1879.

Death 
He died in Cleveland and was interred in Woodland Cemetery.

Sources

Bibliography

1816 births
1879 deaths
People from Tiffin, Ohio
Politicians from Cleveland
Ohio lawyers
Politicians from Frederick, Maryland
Democratic Party members of the United States House of Representatives from Ohio
19th-century American politicians
Burials at Woodland Cemetery (Cleveland)
19th-century American lawyers